Apotoforma rotundipennis is a species of moth of the family Tortricidae. It is found on the Virgin Islands.

The wingspan is about 11 mm. The forewings are tawny reddish, with a faintly indicated oblique greyish-fuscous shade from before the middle of the costa, extending to the lower edge of the cell. There is a similar curved shade before the apex and waved lines of sublustrous scales on the outer half of the wing and there is a small black dot at the end of the cell. The hindwings are greyish fuscous.

References

Moths described in 1897
Tortricini
Moths of the Caribbean